The Teenagers are an American music group, most noted for being one of rock music's earliest successes, presented to international audiences by DJ Alan Freed. The group, which made its most popular recordings with young Frankie Lymon as lead singer, is also noted for being rock's first all-teenaged act. They were inducted into the Rock and Roll Hall of Fame in 1993.

History
The Teenagers had their origins in the Earth Angels, a group founded at Edward W. Stitt Junior High School in the Washington Heights section of Manhattan by second tenor Jimmy Merchant and bass Sherman Garnes. Eventually, Garnes and Merchant had added lead singer Herman Santiago and baritone Joe Negroni to their lineup and evolved into The Coupe De Villes. In 1954, 12-year-old Frankie Lymon joined the Coupe De Villes, who changed their name to first the Ermines and later the Premiers.

The same year Lymon joined the group, he helped Santiago and Merchant rewrite a song they had composed to create "Why Do Fools Fall In Love". The song got the Teenagers an audition with George Goldner's Gee Records, but Santiago was too sick to sing lead on the day of the audition. Lymon sang the lead on "Why Do Fools Fall in Love" instead, and the group was signed to Gee as The Teenagers, with Lymon as lead singer.

"Why Do Fools Fall in Love" was the Teenagers' first and biggest hit. The group, known for both their harmony and choreography, also had hits with "I'm Not a Juvenile Delinquent" and "The ABC's of Love".

By 1957, the group was being billed as "Frankie Lymon and the Teenagers". This caused in-fighting, and by September, Goldner had pulled Lymon out of the group to record solo. Lymon had little success as a solo artist. He became a heroin addict at the age of 15 and his sales dropped quickly in the early 1960s. In 1966, he stopped using heroin after being forced to go to the army, but on February 27, 1968, he decided to celebrate his good fortune by taking heroin (he was planning to launch a comeback) and died of a heroin overdose at the age of 25 on the floor of his grandmother’s bathroom. He had been clean since entering the army two years earlier.  The Teenagers continued recording, bringing in a new lead. Billy Lobrano, as the group's first white member, made them more racially mixed, now with two black, one white,  and two Hispanic members. The group had little success with Lobrano, and he left.  Sherman Garnes died of a heart attack in 1977, while Joe Negroni died a year later due to a cerebral hemorrhage. Their replacements were Bobby Jay and Frankie's brother Lewis Lymon, respectively. 

In the 1980s, the Teenagers had resorted to using a female singer to imitate Lymon's prepubescent voice, and Pearl McKinnon joined the band. The members at that time were Jimmy Merchant, Herman Santiago, Eric Ward, and Pearl McKinnon. By 1983, Ward had been replaced by Derek Ventura, and in 1984 Phil Garrito took over for Ventura. Roz Morehead replaced McKinnon, and Marilyn Byers moved into Morehead's lead spot. Later in the 1980s the group had settled on a new lead, Jimmy Castor. Castor remained lead until the 1990s, when he was replaced by Timothy Wilson, former lead of Tiny Tim and the Hits. This line-up appeared on the PBS special Doo Wop 51 in 2000.

The group's current line-up is Herman Santiago, Bobby Jay, Terry King and Terrance Farward. They are often billed as Frankie Lymon's Legendary Teenagers or The Legendary Teenagers.

Frankie Lymon & the Teenagers discography

Albums

Singles

Notes:
 1 Released as by "The Teenagers featuring Frankie Lymon"
 2 Early copies released as by "The Teenagers featuring Frankie Lymon"; billing on later pressings changed to "Frankie Lymon & the Teenagers"
 3 Frankie Lymon solo recordings released under the group's name

Films
 Rock, Rock, Rock, 1956, with Chuck Berry, the Moonglows, and the Flamingos.

References

Bibliography
 Nava, Gregory, Andrews, Tina, and Hall, Paul (1998). Audio commentary track from Why Do Fools Fall in Love (DVD release). Los Angeles: Warner Records

Doo-wop groups
Apex Records artists
Musical groups established in 1954
1954 establishments in New York City